Vijayawada-Guntur (Krishna-Guntur) region has several educational institutions. 

Apart from this, the government has already set up AP Council of Higher Education, Technical Education Commissioner, Intermediate Board, Director of School Education offices, College Education Commissioner, APPSC office and CBSE regional office in Vijayawada for the promotion of education in the region.

Central universities and institutions 
All India Institute of Medical Sciences, Mangalagiri
Central Institute of Plastics Engineering & Technology, Vijayawada
Central Institute of Tool Design, Vijayawada
Central Research Institute of Yoga & Naturopathy, Vijayawada
Indian Institute of Plantation Management, Vijayawada
Indira Gandhi National Open University, Rayapudi, Amaravati
National Institute of Design, Amaravati
National Institute of Disaster Management, Vijayawada
National Institute of Fashion Technology, Amaravati
School of Planning and Architecture, Vijayawada

State universities 
Acharya Nagarjuna University
Acharya N. G. Ranga Agricultural University
Dr. YSR University of Health Sciences

Deemed universities 
KL University (Koneru Lakshmaiah College of Engineering)
Vignan's Foundation for Science, Technology & Research

Private universities 
SRM University, Amaravati
VIT-AP University, Amaravati
Amrita Vishwa Vidyapeetham, Amaravati

Engineering Colleges 
Vijayawada-Guntur region is the homw for more than 70 engineering colleges.

Vijayawada
Amrita Sai Institute of Science and Technology
Andhra Loyola Institute of Engineering and Technology
Dhanekula Institute of Engineering and Technology
DJR College of Engineering and Technology
DVR and Dr.HS MIC College of Technology
Lakireddy Bali Reddy College of Engineering
Lingayas Institute of Management and Technology
MVR College of Engineering and Technology
Nimra College of Engineering and Technology
Nova College of Engineering and Technology
NRI Institute of Technology
Paladugu Parvathi Devi College of Engineering and Technology
Potti Sriramulu College of Engineering and Technology
Prasad V. Potluri Siddhartha Institute of Technology
RK College of Engineering
Sri Vani Educational Society Group of Institutions
SRK Institute of Technology
Usha Rama College of Engineering and Technology
Velagapudi Ramakrishna Siddhartha Engineering College
Vijaya Institute of Technology for Women
Vikas College of Engineering and Technology

Guntur
Chalapathi Institute of Engineering and Technology
Chebrolu Engineering College
Guntur Engineering College
KKR and KSR Institute of Technology and Sciences
R.V.R and J.C College of Engineering
Vasireddy Venkatadri Institute of Technology

Medical Colleges

Vijayawada
Nimra Institute of Medical Sciences
Siddhartha Medical College

Guntur
Guntur Medical College
Katuri Medical College
NRI Academy of Medical Sciences

References 

	
Lists of educational organizations
India-related lists